Gulyovka is a rural locality (a selo) in Klintsovsky District, Bryansk Oblast, Russia. The population was 661 as of 2017. There are 13 streets.

Geography 
Gulyovka is located 20 km south of Klintsy (the district's administrative centre) by road. Kurganye is the nearest rural locality.

References 

Rural localities in Klintsovsky District